Ipatele is a commune in Iași County, Western Moldavia, Romania. It is composed of four villages: Alexești, Bâcu, Cuza Vodă and Ipatele.

References

Communes in Iași County
Localities in Western Moldavia